Peter K. De Vuono, Sr. (June 10, 1909 – January 18, 2004) was an American politician and lawyer.

De Vuono was born in Chicago, Illinois and went to the Chicago public schools. He went to DePaul University, Chicago-Kent College of Law and was admitted to the Illinois bar in 1934. He served in the United States Army during World War II. De Vuono practiced law in Chicago. De Vuono served in the Illinois House of Representatives from 1953 to 1955 and was a Republican. De Vuono died at Northwest Community Healthcare in Arlington Heights, Illinois.

Notes

1909 births
2004 deaths
Lawyers from Chicago
Politicians from Chicago
Military personnel from Illinois
Chicago-Kent College of Law alumni
DePaul University alumni
Republican Party members of the Illinois House of Representatives
20th-century American politicians
20th-century American lawyers